Rabbi Ezra Zion Melamed (also ‎, November 22, 1903 – March 9, 1994) was an Israeli biblical and Talmudic scholar, and lexicographer of Aramaic language. He was born in Shiraz, Persia in 1903. He won the 1987 Israel Prize for his work in Biblical interpretation and Rabbinical literature. He was the rabbi of the Persian Jewish community in Jerusalem, succeeding his father's position.

Works

References

Israeli biblical scholars
Jewish biblical scholars
Israeli Esperantists
Iranian Jews
Israeli people of Iranian-Jewish descent
Esperanto speaking Jews
Esperanto lexicographers
People from Shiraz
1903 births
1994 deaths
20th-century Jewish biblical scholars
20th-century lexicographers